William Z. McFarland (born 1991) is an American con artist and convicted felon who co-founded the ill-fated Fyre Festival. He defrauded investors of $27.4 million by marketing and selling tickets to the festival and other events. Vanity Fair describes him as "the poster boy for millennial scamming."

In 2013, McFarland founded Magnises, a card-based club targeted at millennials, using $1.5 million of investor funding. He later founded and was CEO of Fyre Media, which developed the Fyre mobile app for booking music talent. In late 2016, along with rapper Ja Rule, McFarland co-founded the Fyre Festival, a "luxury" music festival intended to promote the Fyre app. The event was scheduled to take place in April and May 2017, but was aborted after attendees had arrived due to problems with security, food, logistics, understaffing, accommodations, and talent relations.

In May 2017, McFarland and Ja Rule were sued for $100 million in a class action lawsuit on behalf of Fyre Festival attendees. The following month, McFarland was arrested and charged with wire fraud in Manhattan federal court for his role in the organization of the festival. After pleading guilty to two counts of wire fraud in March 2018, he was sentenced to six years in a federal prison. He was released in late March 2022, after serving over four years.

Early life and education 
McFarland was born in 1991. He was raised in West Sheffield
Short Hills section of Millburn, New Jersey. His parents are real estate developers. McFarland told the New York Post that at age 13, he founded an online outsourcing startup that matched clients with web designers. He graduated from the Pingry School in 2010. He then attended Bucknell University, where he dropped out in May of his freshman year.

Career 
After McFarland dropped out of college, he founded the short-lived online advertisement platform Spling, where he served as CEO. TechCrunch described Spling as a content sharing network, criticizing its similarity to other services which existed at the time.

In August 2013, McFarland seeded payments company Magnises with $1.5 million of investor funding, aiming to create an exclusive "black card" with social perks, such as club membership, targeted at status-oriented millennials in certain big cities. McFarland also launched Fyre Media Inc., the parent company of the Fyre Festival. In a term sheet sent to investors, Fyre Media claimed to be worth $90 million, however, according to authorities, the company only did about $60,000 in business.

Fyre Festival 

McFarland founded Fyre Media and publicized a luxury music festival in the Bahamas, called Fyre Festival, to promote the Fyre music-booking application. The festival, to be held in April 2017, was advertised by a video which included a bevy of Instagram models including Bella Hadid and Emily Ratajkowski who, along with Kendall Jenner, were all expected to be at the festival. However, the festival experienced a number of serious management, administration and misrepresentation issues, and was canceled after guests had begun to arrive at Great Exuma island. Guests were met with tents and pre-packaged sandwiches instead of the lavish villas and meals they were promised. The festival subsequently became the focus of U.S. federal investigations and multiple lawsuits.

McFarland borrowed as much as $7 million in an effort to fund the festival, taking one loan with an effective annualized rate of 120 percent. McFarland defaulted on the loan and the lender sued.

The controversy around Fyre Festival were detailed in two documentaries in January 2019: Hulu released Fyre Fraud directed by Jenner Furst and Julia Willoughby Nason on January 14, and Netflix released Fyre: The Greatest Party That Never Happened, directed by Chris Smith, on January 18.

Fraud conviction 
On May 1, 2017, Fyre Festival organizers Billy McFarland and Ja Rule were sued for $100 million in a class-action lawsuit in relation to the failed Fyre Festival that left attendees stranded on the island of Great Exuma without basic provisions. In addition to the class-action lawsuit filed in May 2017, 6 federal and 4 individual lawsuits were filed in relation to the scheme. McFarland was arrested by federal agents on June 30, 2017, and charged with wire fraud in relation to Fyre and Fyre Festival. He was released on $300,000 bail on July 1. McFarland faced up to 4 years and 9 months under U.S. sentencing guidelines, according to Assistant U.S. Attorney Kristy Greenberg. She added that McFarland's short but eventful career showed a "pattern of deception" and "overpromising luxury experiences that were not delivered". In July 2017, McFarland was represented by a public defender at a bail hearing after his previous legal team "had not been paid enough to continue to represent him". McFarland later hired the private firm Boies, Schiller & Flexner as representation. While on bail, he committed further fraud with a scheme called "NYC VIP Access" selling tickets to events that had either not been announced or that tickets were unavailable for public purchase to attend, including the Met Gala. Footage of him carrying out this fraud was (inadvertently) recorded and later appeared in Netflix's Fyre documentary.

In March 2018, McFarland pleaded guilty to 2 counts of wire fraud in federal court in Manhattan and admitted to using fake documents to attract investors to put more than $26 million into his company. He agreed to forfeit $26 million. On June 12, 2018, McFarland was charged with selling fraudulent tickets to events such as the Met Gala, Burning Man, and Coachella while out on bail.

Incarceration
On October 11, 2018, McFarland was sentenced to six years in federal prison. During his time in prison, McFarland says he attempted to write a book using voice notes, and create a podcast using a prison phone. He says both of these were not allowed, and therefore he was punished by being put in solitary confinement. In April 2020, during the COVID-19 pandemic, McFarland requested compassionate release from Federal Correctional Institution, Elkton, in Lisbon, Ohio, to avoid contracting the virus, with the reasoning that as an asthmatic he was especially vulnerable to the virus. His request was denied the same month. In July 2020, it was reported that McFarland tested positive for COVID-19 at the facility.

He was released from prison early on March 30, 2022 to be relocated to a halfway house. His time under house arrest ended in September 2022.

Post-incarceration 
In October 2022 McFarland teased in a video on TikTok and YouTube Shorts that he was planning a new business venture called "PYRT", with more details to be announced in November 2022. In an interview with Vanity Fair he described it as “virtual immersive decentralized reality”. The magazine described it as "Fyre Festival Lite, without the capacity issues". The Government of the Bahamas responded to speculation PYRT may hold events in the country by stating they consider him a "fugitive" and would not endorse any event associated with McFarland.

References

1991 births
Living people
21st-century American businesspeople
21st-century American criminals
American businesspeople convicted of crimes
American confidence tricksters
American people convicted of fraud
American technology chief executives
American white-collar criminals
Bucknell University alumni
Businesspeople from New Jersey
Businesspeople from New York City
Criminals from New Jersey
Criminals from New York City
People from Millburn, New Jersey
Pingry School alumni